Urodeta gnoma is a moth of the family Elachistidae. It is found in Kenya.

The wingspan is 5.2–5.9 mm. The ground colour of the forewings is pale ochre to ochre, mottled by brownish-black tips of the scales. Denser brownish-black scales form two irregular patches and brownish-black scales form two small spots. The fringe scales are brownish grey with irregularly scattered brownish black-tipped scales. The hindwings are blackish brown, with a brownish grey fringe.

Etymology
The species name refers to the small body size of the species and is derived from Latin gnomus (meaning dwarf).

References

Endemic moths of Kenya
Elachistidae
Moths described in 2009
Moths of Africa